State Route 191 (abbreviated SR 191) is a  north-south secondary state highway in Benton County, Tennessee.

Route description

SR 191 runs from I-40 (Exit 133) north to Nathan Bedford Forest State Park just north of Eva, Tennessee.  This highway crosses US 70, US 70 Bus, and SR 69A.  The section of road from I-40 to US 70 is also known as Birdsong Road.  This highway passes through the small communities of Chalk Level, Eva, and the town of Camden. 

Near the northern terminus this road features unstripped shoulders, narrow roadway width, hairpin curves, and degraded pavement.

Major intersections

References
Benton County Highway Map
Tennessee Department of Transportation

191
Transportation in Benton County, Tennessee